Carlier is a Francophone surname.  Notable people with the surname include:

 Dominique Carlier (born 1959), footballer and coach
 Edmond Carlier (1861–1940), physiologist and entomologist
 Franz Carlier, Belgian footballer
 Guy Carlier (born 1949), French author and chronicler
 Jacky Carlier (born 1961), French athlete
 Joseph Carlier (1849–1927), French sculptor
 Libera Carlier (1926–2007), captain, pilot, and writer 
 Modeste Carlier (1820–1878), Belgian painter, lauréat of the Prix de Rome
 Nicholas Carlier (born 1968), English cricketer
 Pierre Carlier (born 1915), Swiss basketball player
 René Carlier, 17th century French architect
 Rudy Carlier (born 1986), French footballer
 Vincent Carlier (born 1979), French footballer
 Carlier (chess player), active c. 1800
 Carlier, a protagonist in Joseph Conrad's story "An Outpost of Progress"

See also
 Carlier Springs